The 1882 Columbia football team represented Columbia University in the 1882 college football season.

Schedule

References

Columbia
Columbia Lions football seasons
College football winless seasons
Columbia football